Asianellus festivus is a species of jumping spiders with a palearctic distribution.  It can be found in Lithuania, where they are considered to be a new species. The spider has also been newly found in Serbia.

Description
Males are about 6 mm whereas females are 7-8 mm. The spider prefers dry, rocky habitats.

References

Salticidae
Spiders of Europe
Palearctic spiders
Spiders described in 1834